The Dubai International Motor Show (The Middle East International Motor Show) is a biennial auto show held in the Emirate of Dubai, in the United Arab Emirates. Due to the high interest of expensive cars in Dubai, it attracts many major car manufactures, tuning companies and other related companies, including major super car manufacturers.

Photos from the Dubai Motor Show 2005:

2017 
 Chevrolet Corvette ZR1
 Devel Sixteen
 Devel Sixty
 McLaren 720S MSO 
Bruce McLaren Edition

2015 
 W Motors Fenyr SuperSport

2011 
 BMW 750Li "UAE Edition"
 Brabus CL V12 800 Coupe
 Brabus E V12 800 Convertible
 Bugatti Veyron Grand Sport Yellow Black Carbon
 Bugatti Veyron Grand Sport Blue Carbon Aluminum 
 Bugatti Veyron Grand Sport Green Carbon Aluminum
 Chevrolet TrailBlazer Concept
 De Macross GT1
 Jaguar XJ Sport Pack
 Jaguar XJ Speed Pack
 Land Rover Range Rover Evoque by Startech
 Nissan Juke-R Concept
 Mansory Continental GT
 Mansory Range Rover Sport
 Mercedes-Benz SLS AMG Roadster

2009 
 A.R.T. G Streetline
 Brabus GLK V12
 Bugatti Veyron Grand Sport Soleil Du Nuit
 Bugatti Veyron Sang d’Argent
 Bugatti Veyron Nocturne
 Gemballa GT 500 Aero 3 
 Kia Cadenza
 Kepler MOTION
 Mercedes-Benz SLS 63 AMG "Desert Gold" 
 Mercedes-Benz G 55 AMG Edition 79
 Porsche Cayenne Turbo “Gold Edition”
 Zenvo ST1
 PPI Razor GTR Carbon Fiber

2007

 Kleemann ML63K
 Maybach 62 S Landaulet
 SSC Ultimate Aero

2005

The 8th Middle East International Motor Show 2005, the premier biennial event for automobiles and aftermarket sectors scheduled to take place from December 12 to 16, 2005 at the Dubai International Convention and Exhibition Centre.

 Brabus Mercedes-Benz Unimog U500 Black Edition
 DC Design Mercedes-Benz S500 Stretch Concept
 DC Design DC Star XS Concept
 Mercedes-Benz ML 63 AMG

Sources

References

External links
 Dubai Motor Show 

Auto shows in the United Arab Emirates
Events in Dubai
Recurring events established in 1989
1989 establishments in the United Arab Emirates